Hellinsia fletcheri is a moth of the family Pterophoridae. It is found in India.

References

Moths described in 1992
fletcheri
Moths of Asia